Skip McDonald (born Bernard Alexander, September 1949) is an American musician who also performs under the stage name Little Axe.

Career

Early career
Grounded in blues music learned from his father, a steel worker who played blues guitar at weekends, McDonald spent his early days playing jazz, doo-wop, and gospel, and eventually relocated to New York City as a teenager with his band of friends, called The Entertainers.

McDonald formed the group Wood Brass & Steel in 1973 with bass guitarist Doug Wimbish and drummer Harold Sargent. The group recorded two albums before their 1979 breakup. He then became part of the house band for Sugarhill Records and appeared as a session player on many early rap albums, including  "The Message" by Grandmaster Flash and The Furious Five.

Post-Sugarhill
After leaving Sugarhill, McDonald, Wimbish, and drummer Keith LeBlanc began working with Adrian Sherwood, and eventually formed the trio into the industrial/dub group Tackhead, initially fronted by Gary Clail and later Bernard Fowler. McDonald would also collaborate with Sherwood on other projects, including albums by African Head Charge and Mark Stewart.

In the 1990s, McDonald assumed the moniker "Little Axe" and began moving from hip hop to a form of blues that drew from an array of musical influences, including dub, R&B, gospel, and jazz. He has been working steadily as a studio musician, recording both his own blues albums, continuing to appear as a guest act on other artists' albums as well. His most recent albums have been released on Real World Records. Alan Glen is often featured on harmonica on these albums.

In 2009 he collaborated with Mauritanian musician Daby Touré to produce a record titled Call My Name.

As of 2016, he still tours and gigs regularly, has a loyal following and is in regular demand for session work as a guitarist.

Discography
 Never Turn Back (1993, Spin)
 The Wolf that House Built (1994, Okeh/Wired)
 Slow Fuse (1996, Wired)
 Hard Grind (2002, On-U Sound)
 Champagne & Grits (2004, Real World/Virgin)
 Stone Cold Ohio (2006, Real World/Virgin)
 Bought for a Dollar, Sold for a Dime (2010, Real World)
 If You Want Loyalty Buy a Dog (2011, On-U Sound)
 Wanted - Live 1996 (2012, Little Axe Recordings)
 Return (2013, Echo Beach)
 One Man - One Night (2016, 12:10 Records)
 London Blues (2017, Echo Beach)

References

1949 births
Living people
American blues guitarists
American male guitarists
American blues singers
American male singers
American session musicians
Songwriters from Ohio
Record producers from Ohio
Fat Possum Records artists
Singers from Ohio
Musicians from Dayton, Ohio
Real World Records artists
Tackhead members
Guitarists from Ohio
20th-century American guitarists
Fats Comet members
21st-century American guitarists